Richie Koh is a Singaporean actor and a contracted artiste under MediaCorp and China’s LongAllStar Entertainment Group.

Personal life
Koh graduated from Ngee Ann Polytechnic with a Diploma in Financial Informatics in 2014. He completed his national service in the Republic of Singapore Air Force (RSAF).

Career
In 2013, Koh was scouted when Channel U’s Hey Gorgeous team went to various campuses in Singapore looking for suitable contestants. He garnered much support during the competition and emerged as first runner-up.

In 2017, after serving National Service, Koh started his career by debuting in Channel 8’s army-themed drama When Duty Calls, a major role that charmed viewers' hearts. Fans sang praises of his natural acting and good looks, factors which landed him his first nomination for Best Newcomer in Star Awards 2018. October that year saw Koh jetting off to Changzhou, Jiangsu for a month to film China-web movie The Legendary Detective of the Shanghai Bund where he played an assistant to the agency detective.

The following year, Koh made cameo appearances in long-running Channel 8 drama Life Less Ordinary, & Toggle series Die Die Also Must Serve. In addition, he wrapped up filming on 118 Reunion and made a special appearance in local movie Wonderful! Liang Xi Mei directed by Jack Neo. His role as a gangster boss in the movie saw him gain new fans both here and across the Causeway. Koh also acted in several Toggle Original productions such as Star Crossed, and he took the lead role in Divided as well as The Distance Between. In addition, Koh acted in a Gilbert Chan movie 23:59 The Haunting Hour as a soldier tasked to kill a snake spirit.

On 30 August 2018, The Celebrity Agency announced that Koh would be expanding his career to China after it signed a co-management contract with China’s LongAllStar Entertainment Group. The actor will be based in Beijing after filming Toggle Original series Playground, but there are plans for him to head back to Singapore when he has a local production to shoot.

In 2021, Koh starred as Zhu Yongjie in Live Your Dreams, where he was nominated MyPick! Favourite Male Show Stealer and Favourite CP in Star Awards 2022.

In 2022, Koh soared to fame after starring in the immensely popular Your World In Mine as an intellectually disabled Zheng Tiancai, where he receives his first Best Actor nomination in Star Awards 2023. Koh was also nominated Best Actor in a Leading Role at the Asian Television Awards in 2022.

Filmography

Television

Film

Awards and nominations

References

Living people
Singaporean people of Chinese descent
Singaporean male film actors
Singaporean male television actors
Singaporean television personalities
21st-century Singaporean male actors
1993 births